Laurie Blouin (born April 7, 1996) is a Canadian freestyle snowboarder. She is the reigning FIS World Champion in slopestyle, winning the gold at the 2017 World Championships. Blouin won a silver medal in slopestyle at the 2018 Winter Olympics in Pyeongchang, South Korea.

Career
Blouin was an entrant at the 2017 FIS World Championships in Sierra Nevada, Spain. In the final of the slopestyle event, she scored a 78.00, holding off silver medalist Zoi Sadowski-Synnott, who scored 77.50. She also finished 1st in qualifications and 6th in the final at the Big Air event. Blouin credited the "vibe" and atmosphere of Sierra Nevada for her world championship, saying, "I was not that stressed because the weather is so incredible here [and] the vibe is so fun. Before I dropped [in], I was super focused, and I told myself I was just going to drop [in] and just have fun."

Building on her world championship Blouin went to the 2018 Winter Olympics as a strong medal hopeful. Those hopes seemed to be dashed when she crashed hard in training after her snowboard cut a rut and had to be carried off the slope on a stretcher. Teammate Mark McMorris would later say of her injury that "She whacked her noggin pretty good and cut up her face." Defying the hard fall, Blouin had her name on the rider list for Sunday's qualifying runs. High winds delayed the qualifying; instead, the final would be two runs for all the female athletes the next day. In the final, high winds continued, but the finals were not called off, controversially, as many riders would fall in the buffeting winds. Blouin, sporting a black eye from her crash, also fell on her first run. She overcame these plights and ran a clean but easier attempt on the second run. On her third and final jump, she only tried a cap single cab underflip instead of a double. This clean run was enough for her to win the silver medal behind American Jamie Anderson. Blouin acknowledged her difficult situation, but despite it all said after that, "Now I'm here in second place, I just don't believe it. It's a dream come true."

Blouin made her World Cup debut at her home resort in Stoneham, Quebec, in February 2012. Her first World Cup podium came when she finished second in slopestyle at the New Zealand Winter Games in August 2015. She claimed another World Cup silver at Seiser Alm, Italy, in January 2017. Blouin wrapped up her 2016–17 season with a slopestyle victory at a World Snowboard Tour event, the Grandvalira Total Fight, in Andorra. Blouin won a slopestyle silver medal at the X Games in Aspen on January 25, 2020.

In January 2022, Blouin was named to Canada's 2022 Olympic team.

References

External links

1996 births
Living people
Canadian female snowboarders
Olympic silver medalists for Canada
Olympic snowboarders of Canada
Medalists at the 2018 Winter Olympics
Olympic medalists in snowboarding
Snowboarders at the 2018 Winter Olympics
Snowboarders at the 2022 Winter Olympics
Sportspeople from Quebec City
X Games athletes